Séné is a commune in the Morbihan department of Brittany in north-western France.

Population
The inhabitants of Séné are known in French as Sinagots.

Breton language
The municipality launched a linguistic plan through Ya d'ar brezhoneg on 22 September 2006.

See also
Communes of the Morbihan department

References

External links

Official website 

 Mayors of Morbihan Association 

Communes of Morbihan